Óscar Dalmiro Bagüí Angulo (born December 10, 1982 in Borbón, Esmeraldas Province) is an Ecuadorian footballer who plays for Emelec in the Ecuadorian Serie A.

International career
Bagüí has earned 19 caps with the Ecuador national team. His first cap came on January 26, 2005 against Panama in Ambato. He was called up to play in the 2007 Copa América by coach Luis Fernando Suárez. He started in all three games for Ecuador as they were eliminated by Chile, Mexico, and Brazil. He continued to receive call-ups and caps for the team in 2007 during 2010 FIFA World Cup qualification.  CS Emelec Serie A: 2013

External links
 Bagüí's FEF player card 
 Player profile
 
 Ecuador go from World Cup success to Copa failure

1982 births
Living people
People from Eloy Alfaro Canton
Association football defenders
Ecuadorian footballers
Ecuador international footballers
2007 Copa América players
2014 FIFA World Cup players
2015 Copa América players
C.D. Olmedo footballers
Barcelona S.C. footballers
C.D. Universidad Católica del Ecuador footballers
C.S. Emelec footballers